Yi-Fang Tsay is a Taiwanese botanist. She is a distinguished research fellow at the Institute of Molecular Biology, Academia Sinica.

Education 
For high school she attended Taipei First Girls' High School. She received her bachelor's and master's degree from Department of Botany, National Taiwan University. In 1990 she completed her PhD in biological sciences at Carnegie Mellon University.

Research 
She is a distinguished research fellow at the Institute of Molecular Biology, Academia Sinica. She is best known for her work on nitrate transport, signaling and utilization efficiency in plants.

Awards and recognitions 
She is a recipient of the Taiwan Outstanding Women in Science Award.

In 2021 she was elected to the American National Academy of Sciences.

References 

Living people
Year of birth missing (living people)
Women botanists
Carnegie Mellon University alumni
National Taiwan University alumni
Foreign associates of the National Academy of Sciences
Members of Academia Sinica